Varenets, sometimes anglicised as stewler or simmeler, is a fermented milk product that is popular in Russia. Similar to ryazhenka, it is made by adding sour cream (smetana) to baked milk.

Production 

Varenets is a fermented dairy drink with a caramel taste and creamy color. In the old days milk was baked in a Russian oven and fermented with sour cream.

Commercially available cultured varenets is milk that has been pasteurized and homogenized (with 0.5% to 8.9% fat), and then inoculated with a culture of Streptococcus thermophilus to simulate the naturally occurring bacteria in the old-fashioned product.

See also

 List of dairy products
 List of Russian dishes
 List of yogurt-based dishes and beverages

References 

Fermented dairy products
Russian cuisine
Russian drinks
Russian inventions
Yogurt-based drinks